Kerry Samuel Jacobson (born 19 April 1954) is a New Zealand musician, educator, ARIA hall of fame inductee and former drummer of rock band Dragon. Jacobson was a member from 1976 to 1983, played at their 30-year reunion and at the 2008 ARIA Hall of Fame in Melbourne, Australia. He continues to write and play with Ian Moss and is the drummer for Mondo Rock and his own band The Filthy Animals.

Career

Dragon 
Kerry Jacobson had been a member of various New Zealand groups including Mammal, Tapestry and Ebony before moving to Australia in 1976 where he joined rock music group, Dragon, on drums. He replaced Neil Storey who had died from an accidental drug overdose. He went on to play with the band until their official break-up in 1979. In 1982 Dragon reformed with its original and most notable line-up, including Jacobson, as they needed to pay off some outstanding debts which had accumulated after their breakup in 1979.  After the debt was paid off, the band continued to perform as they enjoyed the limelight again. Feeling exhausted, Jacobson left the band in 1983, after recording the single Rain, to become a session musician. He was then replaced by Terry Chambers from UK band XTC and later Doane Perry from Jethro Tull.

Session Career 
After leaving Dragon in 1983, Jacobson recorded several albums including "Dark Spaces" by Richard Clapton, "Big City Talk" by Marc Hunter and "Shy Boys Shy Girls" by the Kevin Borich Express. He also recorded several tracks on Ian Moss' 2018 album, self-titled Ian Moss, and co-wrote the track "If Another Day (Love Rewards Its Own)".

Education 
In 1990 Jacobson moved to Brisbane where he studied Jazz Drums and Piano at the Conservatorium of Music, earning him a diploma in music.

Mondo Rock 
Jacobson joined Mondo Rock for a brief period of time before leaving the band in 1981. He later rejoined in 2003 to perform in the Hear and Now Tour which toured Australia nationally. He also performed with Mondo Rock at the 2006 Countdown Spectacular and still performs with the band at various outdoor festivals around Australia.

Ian Moss 
Since the 1990s, Jacobson has toured with many different acts, including a European tour with Cold Chisel guitarist Ian Moss. He continues to write and perform with Ian Moss to this day.

Other Acts Performed With

National Acts 

 Renee Geyer (2006-2010)
 The Black Sorrows (2016)

International Acts 

 The Supremes (USA)

 Canned Heat (USA)
 Eugene "Hideaway" Bridges (USA)
 Shirley Myers (Canada)

 Leo Sayer (UK)

Present Day 
Jacobson is endorsed by Dixon drums, Bosphorus cymbals, Promark drumsticks and Evans drum heads (D'Addario). Jacobson currently teaches percussion at a private school in Brisbane, Australia. He still performs live with Ian Moss, Mondo Rock and many others. He also performs with his own band The Filthy Animals, a classic rock cover band formed during the 2021 COVID-19 lockdown. The band usually plays cover songs at corporate gigs; the band often features, among many others, Kerry Jacobson (Dragon, Mondo Rock, Ian Moss), Brett Williams (The Choirboys), and Glen Muirhead (Eurogliders, James Reyne Band).

Discography (With Dragon)

Albums

Singles

See also 
 Music in New Zealand

Awards

ARIA Awards 
Kerry Jacobson was inducted into the ARIA Hall of Fame in 2008 for his work with Dragon.
|-
| 2008
| Dragon
| ARIA Hall of Fame
| 
|}

New Zealand Music Awards 
Kerry Jacobson was inducted into the New Zealand Music Hall of Fame in 2011 for his work with Dragon.
|-
| 2011
| Dragon
| New Zealand Music Hall of Fame
| 
|}

References 

1954 births
Dragon (band)
Living people
Musicians from Wellington
New Zealand drummers
New Zealand expatriates in Australia